The Undergraduate Student Government (USG) at Stony Brook University is a governing body representing the undergraduate students of Stony Brook University. As with most student governments in the United States, one of USG's main functions is to recognize, fund and regulate student organizations. The USG is composed of an executive and a legislative branch; a judicial branch existed until a constitutional amendment removed it in 2019. Along with the Graduate Student Organization, USG is the only other organization authorized to distribute the Student Activity Fee (SAF) in a viewpoint-neutral manner. In accordance with State University of New York Policies and Procedures, the mandatory SAF provides the USG with an annual budget of approximately $3.1 million, independently of the state budget.

USG's finances are managed by the Faculty Student Association (FSA), an auxiliary services corporation whose budget is independent of the university. The annual USG budget is presented for approval to the university's Vice President of Student Affairs, who reviews it on behalf of the university President.

History
Student Government has a long history at Stony Brook University. In 1959, the Student Polity Association was established in Oyster Bay, Long Island. In 2003 the SPA was succeeded by the USG which is the current student government of Stony Brook University.

Student Polity Association
The original student government was known as the Student Polity Association, Inc (Polity). Polity was established on May 8, 1959 when the Polity constitution was ratified by well over two-thirds of the student body. The name Polity comes from the original debate regarding student government. There were two opposing viewpoints, one argued for a Republican form of government, and the other for a Democratic form of government. Both sides drafted a constitution and presented them to the student body on April 22, 1959. A two-day constitutional convention was held from April 23 to April 24, at which both of these forms were discussed and debated. On April 28, 1959 a vote was held and the Polity constitution received the majority of votes.

One of the main purposes of Polity was to distribute the Student Activity Fee (SAF). Prior to Polity creating the budget, the Faculty Student Association prepared the budget for student activities The first budget prepared by Polity was a total of $12,500.

Decertification
In the Spring 2001 semester, Polity was beset with two issues that resulted in a period of tense relations between the university and itself.  Firstly, the elections for the upcoming academic year were declared invalid by the Polity Supreme Court leaving no elected officials on the executive branch (Polity Council). Secondly, the operating budget for the 2001 - 2002 year was rejected by then Vice President of Student Affairs Dr. Frederick R. Preston citing questionable increases of funding to clubs which had affiliations with elected officials.  Without an approved budget, no disbursement of SAF money could be made to any of the clubs or organizations on campus in the upcoming fall semester.  The Office of Student Affairs responded by installing interim officials on the Polity Council and allowing 25% of the SAF money to be disbursed based on the previous year's budget allocations until the Polity Senate could approve a new budget.

Upon return in the fall, the Polity Senate faced pressure from clubs operating on limited budgets in addition to the refusal by Vice President Preston to allocate any additional SAF funds without a finalized budget, and on October 11 approved their proposed version for Preston's approval. Additionally, Fall elections were scheduled to fill all the seats of the Polity Council which were technically vacant but running with interim officials.  When the election results were tabulated, Interim President Natalie Hodgson won the election, however she failed to secure the required 50% of votes cast necessary under the SPA constitution to win the election by 6 votes. Runoff elections were scheduled to determine the SPA President, however turnout was low with only 154 out of approximately 13,000 undergraduate students voting.  Hodgson lost the runoff election to Malika Granville however V.P. Preston refused to accept the results of the election due to the low turnout and threatened to decertify Polity and place the SAF under administrative receivership until a new Student Government could be established unless the Senate resolved the Presidential issue.
To address V.P. Preston's threat of dissolving Polity, SPA Vice President Akelia Lawrence took over as Interim President until the Senate determined if another runoff election was necessary.  Legislation was passed by the Polity Senate in early February 2002 to forego having another runoff election, and allow Interim President Lawrence to serve out the rest of the year.  Attention was then turned to completing the requirements of a memorandum dated February 25 to President Lawrence which required Polity to "appoint a Judiciary, correct a range of serious problems and contradictions in its constitution 'as it relates to election procedures, budget allocation and balance of power,' and complete the elections that were supposed to have taken place April of 2001." Although a Constitutional Committee was established, the inconsistencies in the Polity governing documents were not addressed.  Citing the failure to meet established requirements, V.P. Preston placed the SAF money under temporary receivership relieving Polity of its obligations to disburse the SAF.  This was done to give Polity the opportunity to concentrate on reforming the internal structure and governing documents without the burden of appropriating SAF money to student clubs and organizations.  The administration then appointed students to the Student Activity Interim Planning Committee which would disburse SAF money to ensure there was no disruption to student clubs on campus.

President Lawrence established a second Constitutional Review Committee which met consistently over the summer between the Spring and Fall 2002 semesters.  A finished revision of the Polity constitution had been created by the committee and was submitted to the Senate for approval.  After Senate approval the constitution was supposed to be placed on the ballot for a special election.  However the Senate amended the constitution reintroducing inconsistencies that the revised constitution was supposed to have removed.  On October 3, 2002, SPA President Akelia Lawrence sent a letter to Stony Brook University President Shirley Strum Kenny requesting help from the administration since Polity was "out of options and very tired [of] trying to make a dysfunctional government function."  Kenny released a memo dated October 11 stating that the Student Polity Association had been decertified following the direct appeal from the SPA President 8 days earlier.

Transition Period
With the decertification of Polity, it ceased to be recognized as the student government on campus able to distribute the student activity fee.  Polity however had not been allowed to distribute the SAF since May since it had been placed in receivership and this was more of a formality to begin the process of forming a new undergraduate student government.  Legally, Student Polity Association, Inc was still a 501(c)(3) non-profit organization operated by the elected officials of the Polity Council and could have remained a student organization on campus.  Many members of the Polity Council were chosen by the university administration to run the interim student government in order to minimize the disruption to clubs/organizations as well as event planning for the undergraduate community.  The interim government was made up of several committees: SAF Special Programming Council and SAF Interim Planning Committee which were designated to plan campus life-oriented activities, the SAF Budget Committee which was responsible for preparing the budget for the following academic year, SAF Promotions and Communications Committee whose task it was to promote the functions of the interim government, the Undergraduate Activity Fee Election Board which would coordinate the adoption of a new government constitution and hold elections for its officials and finally the SAF Interim Finance committee (which included the former Polity Treasurer) to cut checks for clubs and organizations "in consultation with Vice President Preston's office."

Vice President Preston also established the Undergraduate Governance Task Force (GTF) in order to establish the structure of the new undergraduate government.  The GTF was co-chaired by Norm Goodman, former Chair of the Sociology Department and a student from the Harriman School of Business Management and Policy, Jasleen Kaur. The GTF consisted of "11 students, 2 faculty members and 2 members of the administration."  The Deans of the College of Arts and Sciences, College of Engineering and Applied Sciences, Harriman School of Business, and Health Sciences Center appointed 9 students to the task force (6, 1, 1, 1 respectively).  The last two open positions were filled by former Polity President Akelia Lawrence and a member from the student media.  In addition to Goodman, the other faculty member on the GTF was University Senate President Benjamin Walcott.  The university administration representatives were: Dean of Students Jerrold Stein and the Assistant Vice President for Presidential Initiatives, George Meyer.

Early USG Years
Although the Senate and Executive Council were completely restructured, the newly established USG was very similar to the decertified Polity in many ways. All Polity Agencies were carried over, and club funding remained the same. USG was located in the same office with many of the same people and employees. The Student Activities Board was left unchanged, structured much like a club with a general body, and a fraction of the size it was decades ago when Stony Brook was known as a frequent concert venue. In 2004 the Coalition Of Righteous Egalitarians (CORE) sprang up as USG's first political party. It successfully placed itself on top of the USG with the goal of giving a more fair share of funding to religious clubs. When the intent of the party was discovered, they were defeated by the investigative journalism of the Stony Brook Press. The CORE Laws were repealed in the following year.

Reform Years
Recent years have brought various plans to reform the USG, motivated by the state of the Constitution and other documentation left over from Polity days. In many cases, documents had been left unchanged except for the replacement of "Polity" with "USG".

In Spring 2005, the USG Constitution was amended to enable the new government to secure its 501(c)(3) tax-exempt status from the Internal Revenue Service in Article II, Sections 2.2. through 2.4.

During the same semester, new efforts led by the local College Republicans club began to institute wide-ranging reforms, including changes to the Elections Board Bylaws to remove restrictions on electioneering and campaign spending, and to simultaneously allow for the creation of recognized political parties.  And then, pushing for a more comprehensive approach to funding religious and political clubs, who at the time were barred from utilizing the Student Activity Fee. Clubs raised First Amendment objections to the ban, and the Second Clubs and Organizations Bill of Rights was soon promulgated, adopted by the Senate, and signed into law, instituting viewpoint neutral funding criteria for all clubs, which opened the door for religious and political club funding.

With these reforms in place, a year later in Spring 2006, USG's next two parties were formed, with SUCCESS and USG Reform both appearing on the ballot. USG Reform secured a slight majority in the Senate, plus the presidency, and SUCCESS won a majority in the executive council elections.

USG Reform and SUCCESS in a bipartisan fashion the next academic year worked together to amend the USG Constitution to include the viewpoint neutral criteria for funding, ensuring that religious and political clubs' access to the Student Activity Fee would not be rolled back by subsequent administrations. It passed via referendum in Fall 2006, with the changes still included in the USG Constitution to this day, under Article II, Sections 3.2. through 3.10. These were the changes that today allow religious clubs such as the Muslim Student Association and Chabad to secure funding, at $13,322 and $13,405, respectively, and political clubs like College Democrats and College Republicans, which each have $6,637 and $8,713, respectively, in the 2014-15 budget.

Although the original intent was to open up funding for religious and political clubs, the Fall 2006 constitutional changes by design were broadly applied to all clubs.  They guaranteed every club's eligibility to receive funding provided they had open memberships, the right to be allocated an appropriate level of funding in the budget process to function effectively, the right to use that funding in carrying forth their respective missions when submitting vouchers, and required the Senate to institute even-handed, non-discriminatory budgeting criteria when allocating those funds. And, that no separate criteria would be established for receiving funding. Additionally, because of the changes, every club retains the right under Article II, Section 3.7.c. to appeal their budgets to the judicial branch should there ever be an instance of funding discrimination.

A separate amendment was postponed until later in the Fall that year by Vice-President of Student Affairs Peter Baigent and Associate Vice-President of Student Affairs / Dean of Students Jerry Stein. That amendment allowed simply the amount of the Student Activity Fee to be set by a binding referendum. After the postponement, a united delegation of USG Reform and SUCCESS senators and executive council members traveled to the SUNY Assembly in Albany to press the USG's rights to have a Student Activity Fee referendum included in the Constitution, so that any fee increases or decreases would be by popular vote. Ultimately, the ballot to amend the Constitution was allowed by school administrators, ratified by the undergraduate student body, and today appears in Article XI, Section 3 of the Constitution.

Several other reforms were instituted later that academic year under the leadership of the SUCCESS coalition, including the student tutoring program, PASS, which drew bipartisan support. The agency is headed up by the Vice President of Academic Affairs, and received $14,000 in the 2014-15 academic year.

In Fall 2007, attempts began to pass a new USG constitution based more strictly on the United States Constitution, but would have stripped clubs of the explicit, constitutional rights that had just been secured a year prior, including the right of judicial review over club budgets in the event of funding discrimination. It also would have removed the right of the undergraduate student body to vote on the amount of the Student Activity Fee, instead giving that power to the Senate. When clubs were alerted to the changes, although the new constitution's framers assured concerned club leaders subsequent legislation would restore nominal club rights via legislation, voters were not convinced and the reforms were defeated soundly at the ballot box by more than a two-to-one margin.

A Stony Brook Press editorial from V. 29, N. 3, summed up objections to the new proposal: "Although it is flattering that the current drafters would believe that a 'flexible' document would be easier to navigate than the [current] Constitution, which explicitly lists clubs' rights and budgeting processes, this move would ultimately be more detrimental to the students. If the Judiciary were to turn to Constitution 2.0 to reach a verdict pertaining to any club, where would they look? Would they simply end up quoting the same line over and over again [about viewpoint neutrality]? In the [current] Constitution, all clubs can look for any specific information, instead of one small clause about viewpoint neutrality. In this case, we would have to agree that less is definitely not more."

A similar proposal was defeated in Spring 2008 by a two-to-one margin, despite changes that were made to appease critics. Although these proposals failed at the ballot, some of the changes were ultimately made through legislation.

In the 2007-08 academic year, the various bylaws and Senate acts of the USG were consolidated into a unified USG code, similar to the United States Code. The intent of the innovation was such that when the Senate acted to amend existing law, it would be amending the code itself. This would prevent laws enacted from years prior from being lost in the shuffle in between academic years or subject to malicious destruction, a common problem in the early days of USG. To stop the problem, under older practice, the acts of the Senate had been informally kept in a binder at the front desk of the USG office, maintained by the President Pro Tempore and Executive Vice President, and often these were the sole copies of laws available.

The USG code created a formal, orderly way of maintaining the integrity of the laws. To facilitate the process of maintaining the USG code, an Office of Law Revision was established, with members appointed by the Executive Vice President and President Pro Tempore of the Senate, a majority of whom had to be voting members of the Senate.

In the Spring of 2009, two competing parties formed, SBUnited and the Student Advocates party. Each party sought to reform the internal operations of USG. By the end of 2009, the SBUnited party and Student Advocates united to create the Students First Party. The name for the Students First party came from the former Student Polity Association, Inc.

The Students First party passed many major pieces of legislation, the most important was the Establishment of Student Life Act to dissolve the club-like Student Activities Board and replace it with a Board of Directors and a new Student Programming Agency with the goal of bringing higher caliber events to campus more frequently. The Checks and Balances Act which established checks on the discretionary power of the President and limited the ability for students to serve in two different branches. Treasurer Khan led the way in reforming the highly controversial Employment/Pay policies and practices of the USG.

Another major development was the creation of ALLOCATE, an e-voucher system for student clubs and organizations. ALLOCATE was officially launched on November 1, 2010 and all clubs were mandated to use the new sustainable e-voucher system. The project has since spawned the creation of Hueritix Software for the future development and maintenance.

Recent Years: 2010 to Present
The culmination of the reform years was the 2010-2011 Academic year. In this year, the reformed Student Activities Board led the way in Event Programming, hosting popular artists, comedians and lectures to sellout crowds. The historic Stony Brook Concert Series was revitalized under the direction of Student Programming Agency. The Agency coordinated and marketed the new series that featured surf-rock band Best Coast, comedian Aziz Ansari, underground hip hop artist Immortal Technique, and consumer advocate Ralph Nader. The end of the year concert featured pop artists Bruno Mars, Janelle Monáe and Plan B.

In Spring 2011, the USG ran into trouble when it denied funding to the non-partisan Young Americans for Freedom club, claiming its viewpoints and mission were too "similar" to that of the College Republicans, even though the group is not even affiliated with the Republican Party. The government was enforcing the Fall 2010 "New Club Funding Act" that sought to address future funding for groups not already recognized by the USG. The Special Services Council had issued a decision, stating, "After reviewing your club’s mission statement, the Special Services Council has come to the conclusion that your club is very similar to the College Republicans. We are not permitted to recognize new clubs whose mission is similar or an extension of a club that is already recognized and funded by USG." Young Americans for Freedom threatened a lawsuit claiming First Amendment violations and viewpoint discrimination.

Three weeks after the suit was threatened, the USG promptly repealed the "New Club Funding Act," including its onerous requirement that new student groups provide a petition signed by 5% of the student body – about 800 students – supporting their funding, and the Young Americans for Freedom club was granted funding.  According to the club's attorney, the petition requirement posed "an obvious burden on controversial and less popular views on campus." The initial decision to deny funding also appeared to violate the USG Constitution's prohibition in Article II, Section 3.B. that "No Club, Organization, or entity shall be denied the right to funding from the Undergraduate Student Government on the basis of belief, philosophy, creed, opinion, religion, or political persuasion" and, by establishing additional requirements for funding beyond the Constitution, Section 3.F.'s proscription, "The Undergraduate Student Government shall make no law or policy establishing separate criteria for receiving funding."

Branches

Executive Branch

Executive Council

The Executive Council consists of 7 voting members: The President; The Executive Vice President; The Treasurer; Vice-President of Communications & Public Relations; The Vice-President of Academic Affairs; Vice-President of Clubs and Organizations; and the Vice-President of Student Life, Programming & Activities.

Current roster
President: Sowad Ocean Karim
Executive Vice-President: Devin Lobosco
Treasurer:  Sanurag Barobhuiya
Vice-President of Communications and Public Relations:  Nistha Boghra
Vice-President of Academic Affairs: Harrison Feig
Vice-President of Clubs and Organizations: Arsh Naseer
Vice-President of Student Life, Programming and Activities: Wideline Jean

Legislative
The Legislative branch is a unicameral legislature. The Senate consists of the entire Executive Council as non-voting members, twenty-three elected voting Senators, and two appointed voting Senators from the Residence Hall Association (RHA) and Commuters Student Association (CSA).

Current roster
At-Large Senator: Amitesh Reddy Akiti
At-Large Senator: Grace Armann
At-Large Senator: Joseph Bisiani
At-Large Senator: Alexandra Borriello
At-Large Senator: Andrew Candio
At-Large Senator: Alex Casamassima
At-Large Senator: Danny Feliciano
At-Large Senator: Joshua Feng
At-Large Senator: Iqra Ishrat
At-Large Senator: Christian Jean-Pierre
At-Large Senator: Peter Joyce
At-Large Senator: Aliaksandra Kiniova
At-Large Senator: William Laffey
At-Large Senator: Isabella Milgam
At-Large Senator: Anastasia Poulos
At-Large Senator: Rimakshi Roy
At-Large Senator: Samuel Santil
At-Large Senator: Valay Vishal Salve
At-Large Senator: Arnav Sawant
At-Large Senator: Ajay Singh
At-Large Senator: Bonnie Wong
At-Large Senator: Elaine Xiao
At-Large Senator: Alexander Van Geuns
CSA Senator: Daniel Canavin
RHA Senator: Chloe Nevers

Judicial
The Judicial branch consisted of two levels of courts, the Supreme Court and the Judicial Council. The Supreme Court consisted of one Chief Justice, and six Associate Justices. The Judicial Council consisted of three Judges.

In Fall 2019, the student body voted in favor of approving constitutional reform which abolished the Judicial Branch of USG for the purposes of protection from legal liability and improving operational cost efficiency. The changes were justified by the claim that continued payment of Supreme Court Justices for office hours despite a notable lack of tasks available was financially wasteful.

Current roster

Abolished

Current Agencies
The USG has three different types of agencies; independent, quasi-independent, and joint. Independent agencies are agencies that are not aligned with the Legislative or Executive Branches. Ultimately the President is responsible for ensuring that these agencies are functioning properly. Quasi-Independent are agencies that report directly to the President. Joint Agencies are agencies that are created by the President and the Senate.

Student Activities Board, 1959-Present
A quasi-independent agency that provides programs and events on behalf of the USG. The Student Activities Board was significantly reformed in the spring of 2010 with the Establishment of Student Life Act establishing the Student Programming Agency (SPA) as a sub-agency to plan and carry out events, with the Student Activities Board consisting of elected USG representatives to vote on expenditures of the SPA in public meetings.

Student Programming Agency, 2010-Present
Established in May 2010, the new model of event planning replaced the former committee chairs of the SAB with a Director of Event Programming.

PASS Tutoring, 2007-2015
"Providing Academic Support to Students" is a free tutoring service overseen by the VP of Academic Affairs, who can appoint a Director. Applications have traditionally been submitted on the USG website. PASS was repealed following the opening of the Academic Success and Tutoring Center.

Special Services Council (SSC), 1969-Present
A joint agency that reviews and approves/disapproves groups seeking the USG recognition. The SSC also provides additional funding to individuals, clubs and organizations for special events. This was known as the Programming and Services Council or PSC during the Polity years. It began as a decision making body in 1969 for the programs in the newly opened Stony Brook Union. Within Polity, it originally funded all clubs that received less than a certain threshold of funding. The intention was to make the process of starting a club and putting on events as easy as possible for small clubs. Over time, the purpose was less well defined, and indicated by the vague name. In the fall 2010 semester, after the departure of the Chair, USG decided to place this responsibility under the VP of Clubs and Organizations. This resulted in the passage of the 2010 Act to Restore Sanity to the Club Funding Process, which added that the Council would be made up of members from the Senate's Programming and Activities Committee.

Elections Board
The Stony Brook Undergraduate Student Government's Elections Board is an independent agency that ensures all elections within the USG are operated properly and fairly. The Elections Board has historically been a defendant in a USG Supreme Court case over some discrepancy in the execution of the election or the bylaws themselves, though this has recently become a more rare occurrence. As a result, the bylaws have been reformed several times. In 2005, they were amended to remove restrictions on electioneering and campaign spending, and to allow for the creation of recognized political parties that could appear on the ballot in the Spring and Fall elections. As of 2010, the bylaws were completely rewritten, and now include Election Inspectors for the elections of clubs primarily funded by the Undergraduate Student Government with budgets exceeding $10,000 USD.  The USG Senate's Elections Bylaws Act of 2018 has attempted to reasonably regulate the presence of online campaigning, and has now mandated the presence of a Vice Chair–a position previously treated as a norm, and whose duties have never before been codified–amongst other revisions.

Events Management
A quasi-independent agency that provides event management services to all of Stony Brook University's clubs and organizations. As of the Fall of 2010, the Executive Vice President oversees this agency as its Chair. The Executive Vice-President and President jointly appoint a Director to manage the day-to-day operations of the agency.

Audio/Visual Services
A quasi-independent agency that provides audio and visual services to the USG clubs and organizations. Currently, the agency is overseen by the President and he appoints a Director to manage the day-to-day operations of the agency. USG A/V is the successor to SCOOP, Inc.

SBU TV, 1990's - Current 
SBU TV is a quasi-independent agency that provides media services to the USG and its members. This is directed by a professional staff member.

SBTV was a short-lived project of the University in 1992 as a way for students to get hands on involvement in television and television production. In the fall of '92, the Student Polity Association (student government) tried to relaunch the project. Commuters opposed the proposal because they wouldn't be able to view the closed-circuit station. By the spring of 1993, the station was broadcasting on Channel 3 as SPA-TV or "Student Polity Association TV." The station was renamed to 3TV in February 1995. The station operated until the 1999, when it was abruptly shut down by the University due to programming violations. In 2000, the University offered a Television production class, taught by Dini Diskin-Zimmerman, who was the first female director at ABC News, CNN and the Food Network, and was part of the then upstart News 12 Long Island on Cablevision.  A group of students in her class, with guidance from former Student Media Advisor, Norm Prusslin, spoke with the student government, and the University to restart the station.  Part of the agreement was that a professional be hired to oversee operations of the station, and that it adhere to both FCC and University rules and regulations, even if the students still controlled the station, since it was funded by student activity fees. In early Spring 2011, President Matthew Graham, VP of Communications David Mazza and SPA Director Moiz Khan Malik led an initiative to close the closed-circuit aspect of the television stating, citing a lack of activity and consistent waste of funds. They were successful in their attempt as the Senate passed the 2011 Reformation of Stony Brook University - Television and replaced the channel with SMPTE color bars.

Ticket Office
This has been a long-standing presence of student government on campus, mainly providing ticket sales services to large programming clubs. Originally located in the lobby of the Student Union, the ticket office is now located in the Why Lobby of the Student Activities Center, but the Union is still used as a secondary location. This has generally been operated by a professional staff member who hires student employees.

Defunct Agencies

Committee On Cinematographic Arts (COCA), 1962-2005/2010
Established in 1962, COCA was chartered with the task of creating a vibrant campus life for less outgoing students by showing movies on a regular basis. At its peak, COCA was a thriving business showing a Feature Film every Friday and Saturday in the largest lecture hall on campus seating more than 500 students, Javits 100. COCA absorbed another student film program "Tuesday Flicks" (foreign and independent films on Tuesday nights) and developed the "American Cinema" program (double features exploring the auteur concept in American directors on Thursday nights), COCA for Kids (Sunday matinée kids films), "New German Cinema" in cooperation with the German Department on Monday nights, and helped student groups the Science Fiction Forum, Hillel and SAB Concerts develop film programs to the point that there was a movie on campus every day of the week.

COCA sold snacks and candy before the weekend movie generating revenue for more movies and other events on campus, and worked with New Campus Newsreel to screen Newsreel shorts, and make entertaining commercials to support candy sales.

COCA was instrumental in starting ICON, the annual science fiction convention on campus.

In 2002 when Polity was decertified, COCA was reduced to a committee within the Student Activities Board. During the USG years, C.O.C.A. still showed a movie on weekends. No evidence of its existence can be found in the papers after 2005. According to accounts from USG officials from 2008–2010, SAB would typically show a movie once or twice per semester under the name of COCA. The Committee was officially defunct when the SAB was dissolved by the Student Life Act in the spring 2010 semester. However, the new SPA continues to show movies occasionally. The Commuter Student Association also features a "Drive-In Movie" in the South P-Lot at the beginning of every year.

Specula Yearbook, 1961-2005
A quasi-independent agency that provided yearbook services to the USG and its members. The yearbook was abandoned in 2005 due to rising costs and plummeting sales. The cost was estimated to be $50,000 per year, with only a handful of yearbooks sold in the last year. Loss in sales were blamed on new developments on the Internet like Facebook. A book of class portraits became a frivolous and expensive duplication. The USG is considering establishing a new yearbook without portraits for archival and photojournalism purposes. The new yearbook would have an extremely small budget, if any.

Student Cooperative (SCOOP, Inc.), 1969/1971-1993
Incorporated on January 25, 1971, SCOOP, Inc. was the first legal student cooperative at Stony Brook. Steve Rosenthal kicked off the idea with the first student business, the Replacement Coffee Shop in Langmuir College. In 1970, the decision was made to form SCOOP with plans to incorporate in order to unite student businesses under one legitimate organization overseen by the FSA.  SCOOP owned and operated Scoop Audio/Visual, the Replacement Coffee Shop, Tabler II Cafe (Douglass College), Polity-Toscanini Record Shop, Hard Rock Cafe (Toscanini), James College Pub, two Cooperative Cafeterias in Roosevelt, HARPO Ice Cream (Kelly), SCOOP Health Shop (Union), Rainy Night House (Union, where the Salon and the Colours Cafe/Sci-Fi Forum are now) amongst other short-lived businesses throughout the years. The more recent Colours Cafe was operated by Polity and the Harriman Cafe was operated by the Business School. Both were indirect dissidents of SCOOP, but were never a part of it. All businesses on campus are currently operated by the FSA.

In the summer of 1993, SCOOP had accumulated more than $55,000 in debt to local businesses and vendors. Upon receiving complaints from these businesses, the University requested that the FSA look into dissolving SCOOP, which it had the power to do contractually. In early September 1993, SCOOP was closed down, with three remaining businesses left with an uncertain fate.

Department of Web Technologies, 2010-2012
Originally named the Office of Web Technologies and Financial Informatics (OWTFI), this was formed in the Spring of 2010 to coincide with the development of ALLOCATE, an open source project known as the Student Life Loupe. The intent is for this agency to continue to develop and maintain all software and web assets of the USG, in order to remove this responsibility from elected officials who may not have the ability to do so.

Department of Justice
A quasi-independent agency headed by the Advocate General, who serves as the USG's representative for internal court cases, as well as an investigator into financial issues. In 2008, the Student Bureau of Investigation (SBI) was established to assist the Advocate General in investigating potentially fraudulent uses of the Student Activity Fee, but the Bureau has been on indefinite hiatus since then.

External links
 Official Website of the Undergraduate Student Government at Stony Brook University
 University Archives' Digital Collection of Campus Media Publications

References

 
Stony Brook University
Student governments in the United States